The Hunter 25-2, sometimes referred to as the Hunter 25-2005 or the Hunter 25 Mark III, is an American trailerable sailboat that was designed by Glenn Henderson as a cruiser and first built in 2005.

The Hunter 25-2 replaced the Hunter 240 and 260 in the company product line.

The design was originally marketed by the manufacturer as the Hunter 25, but is now usually referred to as the Hunter 25-2, 25-2005 or Mark III, to differentiate it from the unrelated 1972 Hunter 25 design.

Production
The design was built by Hunter Marine in the United States from 2005 until 2009, but production ended during the Great Recession.

Design

The Hunter 25-2 is a recreational keelboat, built predominantly of fiberglass, with wood trim. It has a B&R masthead sloop rig with aluminum spars, a raked stem, a walk-through, rounded reverse transom, a transom-hung rudder controlled by a wheel and a fixed fin shoal draft keel. It displaces  and carries  of lead ballast.

The design has sleeping accommodation for four people, with a double "V"-berth in the bow cabin and an aft cabin with a double berth under the cockpit. The galley is located on the starboard side just forward of the companionway ladder. The head is located on the port side, beside the companionway steps. The main cabin has a drop-leaf table and two straight seats that each accommodate two people. The cabin has forward-facing rectangular ports.

Operational history
In a 2010 review Steve Henkel wrote, "best features: the elevated seats on the stern quarters have proven to be very popular among boat buyers, giving an uninterrupted 'catbird's seat' view of the scene without interference from the cabinhouse or other cockpit occupants. A mast-raising system—similar to the Catalina 250—makes life at the launching ramp easier. Worst features: Like the Lancer 25, the extremely shallow fixed keel (2' 0" draft compared to the Lancer's 2' 4") is not adequate to prevent noticeable sideslip while sailing upwind."

See also

List of sailing boat types

Related development
Hunter 25
Hunter 240
Hunter 260
Hunter 27 Edge

Similar sailboats
Bayfield 25
Beneteau First 25S
C&C 25
Capri 25
Catalina 25
Kirby 25
MacGregor 25
Mirage 25
O'Day 25
Redline 25
Tanzer 25
US Yachts US 25

References

External links

Official 2005 brochure

Keelboats
2000s sailboat type designs
Sailing yachts
Trailer sailers
Sailboat type designs by Glenn Henderson
Sailboat types built by Hunter Marine